Thierry is a French male given name, derived from the Germanic "Theodoric". It is the cognate of German "Dietrich" and "Dieter", English Terry, Derek and Derrick, and of various forms in other European languages. It is also a surname.

People with the given name
 Theodoric of Freiberg (c. 1250-c. 1310), also known as Thierry, early Dominican
 Thierry of Chartres (died before 1155), French philosopher
 Theodoric I, Duke of Upper Lorraine (ruled 978–1027)
 Theodoric II, Duke of Lorraine (ruled 1070–1115)
 Theuderic II (587–613), king of Burgundy and Austrasia
 Thierry, Count of Flanders (c. 1099–1168), also known as Derrick or Thierry of Alsace
 Thierry Ambrose (born 1997), French footballer
 Thierry Baudet (born 1983), Dutch politician and author
 Thierry Boutsen (born 1957), Belgian Formula One race car driver
 Thierry Breton (born 1955), European Commissioner for Internal Market, French businessman, former Minister of the Economy
 Thierry Brusseau, French track and field athlete
 Thierry Claveyrolat (1959–1999), French road bicycle racer
 Thierry Cornillet (born 1951), French politician
 Thierry Dusautoir (born 1981), French rugby player
 Thierry Fischer (born 1957), Swiss conductor and flautist
 Thierry Garnier, businessman, CEO of Kingfisher
 Thierry Guetta (born 1966), French street artist
 Thierry Gueorgiou (born 1979), French orienteer
 Thierry Henry (born 1977), French football player
 Thierry Hermès (1801–1878), founder of fashion house Hermès
 Thierry Jonquet (1954–2009), French writer
 Thierry Lamberton (born 1966), French speed skater
 Thierry Lhermitte (born 1952), French actor
 Thierry Lincou (born 1976), French squash player
 Thierry Mariani (born 1958), French politician
 Thierry Maulnier (born 1908), French journalist, essayist, dramatist and critic
 Thierry Mugler (1948–2022), French fashion designer
 Thierry Meyssan (born 1957),  French journalist
 Thierry Morel, French art historian and curator
 Thierry Mutin, French singer
 Thierry Neuville (born 1988), Belgian rally driver
 Thierry Paulin (1963–1989), French serial killer
 Thierry Pastor, (born 1960) French singer
 Thierry Pelenga, Anti-balaka leader from Haute-Kotto prefecture in the Central African Republic and a war criminal
 Thierry Roussel (born 1953), fourth husband of Christina Onassis
 Thierry Ruinart (1657–1709), French Benedictine monk and scholar
 Thierry Sabine (1949–1986), French race driver, and founder and main organizer of the Dakar Rally
 Thierry St-Cyr (born 1977), Canadian politician
 Thierry Michel Vos (born 1977), Dutch Microsoft Windows Insider MVP
 Thierry Zéno (born 1950), Belgian author and filmmaker
 Thierry Zéphir (born 19??), French author and curator

People with the surname
 Augustin Thierry (1795–1856), French historian
 Amédée Thierry (1797–1873), French historian, brother of the above
 John Thierry (born 1971), American former National Football League player
 Mélanie Thierry (born 1981), French actress

Fictional characters with the given name
 Thierry, friend of Roland in the epic poem The Song of Roland
 Thierry, in the 1621 English stage play Thierry and Theodoret
 Thierry, King of Morianel in the 12th-century chanson de geste Garin le Loherain
 Thierry Vanchure, a recurring character in The Originals TV series
 Thierry Morello, also known as Aiber, a secondary character in Death Note
 Thierry of Janville, the main character in the TV series Thierry la Fronde

Fictional characters with the given surname
 Laurent Thierry, a main character in the Great Pretender anime series.

See also
Thiery (surname)
Thiry, surname

French masculine given names